The Barcelona of 1842 was a keg of social conflict. Amongst the issues was the free trade policy of the regent  General Espartero and the damage it was causing to the textile industry and the livelihood of workers.  Another simmering issue was the tax required to be paid for bringing food into the city. A climate of permanent tension existed in the city that foreshadowed an eventual explosion of violence.

The trigger came when a group of some 30 workers returning to the city on 13 November 1842 tried to smuggle a small amount of wine into the city without paying the tax. An uprising spread like wildfire, and within hours the working classes of the city had taken up a war footing. The Government's reactions inflamed the civil revolt which quickly brought together interests across the social strata (including the industrialist Joan Güell and the Marquis of Llió) in opposition to the Government. The local militia also took part and by the 15th the streets had been barricaded and the army had to take refuge in the Montjuic Castle and Parc de la Ciutadella after suffering possibly up to 600 dead and wounded. 

After 3 weeks and the Governments refusal to negotiate, the 'Bombardment of Barcelona''' occurred on 3 December 1842. It was ordered personally by General Espartero who had gone to Barcelona to put down the uprising.
 The Montjuic Castle now acquired its new historical purpose in regards to the new beginnings of liberal Barcelona. The indiscriminate artillery bombardment of the city was made from Montjuïc under the command of Captain General Antonio Van Halen. The cannons fired 1014 projectiles and caused at least twenty deaths and widespread destruction throughout the city (some 462 buildings). 

Context

The reign of Isabella II (1833-1868) was seen as very troubled as she first came to the throne as an infant. Her succession was disputed by the Carlists, who refused to recognize a female sovereign, leading to the Carlist Wars. Isabella’s failure to respond to growing demands for a more progressive regime contributed to the decline in monarchical strength.

The Carlist War was a civil war in Spain that was fought between factions over the succession to the throne and the Spanish monarchy. This was one of the major stepping stones that led to the bombardment. The Carlist force was made up of all who opposed the liberal revolution: small rural nobility, lower clerics, and many farmers that believed that liberalism would bring higher taxes. 

In addition to being regent, Espartero also served as prime minister of Spain 3 times. He was associated with Spanish liberalism that would ultimately use him as a symbol of victory over the Carlists.

Consequences
The repression ordered by the Government was very harsh. The militia was disarmed and several hundred people were arrested. Between seventeen and eighteen individuals from the Patuleyas (militia) and one of their commanders were shot.

In addition, the city was collectively punished with the payment of an extraordinary contribution of 12 million reais to compensation the dead or wounded soldiers and the city council had to pay for the reconstruction of the Citadel. The Government, at the proposal of Espartero, also dissolved the Association of Weavers of Barcelona (the first union in the history of Spain) and closed all newspapers except the conservative Diario de Barcelona''.

References

Military history of Barcelona
1842 in Spain
Conflicts in 1842
December 1842 events
19th century in Barcelona